The Trindade petrel (Pterodroma arminjoniana) is a species of seabird and a member of the gadfly petrels.

The petrel has various color morphs: dark and light, as well as intermediates between the two. Previously, two separate populations were considered conspecific, one occurring in the south Pacific, sometimes seen in Hawaii; the other occurring in the south Atlantic, nesting off Brazil, with regular sightings in the Gulf Stream off the southeastern United States. The little-known Pacific birds were then split and determined distinct as the Herald petrel, Pterodroma heraldica.
It uses oceanic islands and atolls, nesting on cliff ledges, ridges or rocky slopes. On some islands, nesting birds are threatened by feral cats and rats.

Due to ongoing habitat loss and small breeding range, this species is evaluated as vulnerable on the IUCN Red List of Threatened Species.

The specific name is after Vittorio Arminjon, captain of the ship during the voyage in which the specimen was collected.

Notes

References

 "National Geographic"  Field Guide to the Birds of North America 
  Seabirds, an Identification Guide by Peter Harrison, (1983) 
 Handbook of the Birds of the World Vol 1,  Josep del Hoyo editor, 
 "National Audubon Society" The Sibley Guide to Birds, by David Allen Sibley,

External links 
 BirdLife species factsheet

Trindade petrel
Birds of Brazil
Birds of the Atlantic Ocean
Nature Conservation Act endangered biota
Trindade petrel
Trindade petrel
Trindade petrel